Lenore Guinzberg Marshall (September 7, 1899, New York City – September 23, 1971, Doylestown, Pennsylvania) was an American poet, novelist, and activist.

Life
She was the daughter of Harry and Leonie (Kleinert) Guinzburg. She graduated from Barnard College in 1919.

She married James Marshall, son of New York lawyer Louis Marshall. Lenore and James had two children, Ellen and Jonathan; they lived in New York City.

From 1929 to 1932, Lenore Marshall worked as an editor at Cape and Smith, where she was instrumental getting them to publish The Sound and the Fury by William Faulkner. She also edited As I Lay Dying.

Her work appeared in Harper's, and The New Yorker.

Her son Jonathan Marshall owned and published the Scottsdale Daily Progress newspaper. Jonathan ran unsuccessfully for United States Senate against Barry Goldwater in 1974.

Activism
In 1933, she became the treasurer of the Writers' League Against Lynching, and corresponded with Theodore Dreiser, who was a member, and who wrote the anti-lynching story "Nigger Jeff".

In 1956, with Norman Cousins, she helped found SANE, the National Committee for a Sane Nuclear Policy.  She continued her anti-nuclear work with the Committee for Nuclear Responsibility.  She corresponded with Irving Howe.

I am not embattled. I'm battling, and that makes life so much more interesting.

She lived at the Dorset Hotel, and New Hope, Pennsylvania.
In 1971, she was on the board of PEN.

Lenore Marshall Poetry Prize
The Lenore Marshall Poetry Prize is given each year by the Academy of American Poets. The Prize was created in 1975 by the New Hope Foundation of Pennsylvania, which, until 1987, was a philanthropic foundation created by Lenore Marshall and her husband, James Marshall, to "support the arts and the cause of world peace"; Lenore Marshall, a poet, novelist, editor, and peace activist, had died in 1971.

Awards
 MacDowell Colony Fellow

Works

Poetry

Fiction

Memoir

Non-fiction

Anthologies

Reviews
On The Hill is Level: "It is a novel of philosophical ideas and of literary culture, of moral idealism and social criticism. The central theme is a woman's struggle to emancipate herself and lead a good life."

"Her prose is freshest when it is specific, describing a union organizer with great affection or an advocate of nuclear weapons with unusual cruelty.  There are passages about her children written with wide-open eyes and a generous heart.  When she deals more generally with Literature or Politics or Life, she sometimes gets fuzzy or even affected."

References

1899 births
1971 deaths
20th-century American poets
American anti–nuclear weapons activists
Barnard College alumni
20th-century American novelists
American women poets
American women novelists
20th-century American women writers